In 1867 the Austrian Empire reorganized with the Austro-Hungarian Compromise into a dual monarchy, in light of this, many Slovenes reverted into their "maximalist" ways, with a demand of  a "United Slovenia", they initiated a series of mass political meetings, called "Tabori," after the Czech model. The movement led to a call for political/cultural union of Slovenes.

Slovenes, Croats, and Serbs followed closely the liberation and unification such as in Italy, Germany, Greece, and Serbia. While Austria lost its northern Italian provinces, it gained in Bosnia, which led to a movement for unification of South Slavic groups, (Yugoslavs), into a third unit within Austria Hungary.

See also 

 United Slovenia
 Slovenian National Party
 Slovenian nationalism

References 

Irredentism